Victor Olufemi Adebowale, Baron Adebowale,  (born 21 July 1962) is the former Chief Executive of the social care enterprise Turning Point, current Chair of the NHS Confederation and was one of the first individuals to become a People's Peer. 

He was appointed a Commander of the Order of the British Empire (CBE) in the 2000 New Year Honours for services to the New Deal, the unemployed, and homeless young people. In 2001 he became one of the first group of people to be appointed as people's peers and was created a life peer on 30 June 2001 taking the title Baron Adebowale, of Thornes in the County of West Yorkshire, sitting as a crossbencher. In 2009 he was listed as one of the 25 most influential people in housing policy over the past 25 years by the housing professionals magazine Inside Housing.  He was reckoned by the Health Service Journal to be the 97th most influential person in the English NHS in 2015.

Life and career
Adebowale was born to Nigerian parents Ezekiel and Grace Adebowale, who both worked in the UK's National Health Service. His name "Adebowale" means "the crown comes home" in Yoruba. The use of last names that reference crowns in this way by the Yoruba people is usually indicative of royal ancestry within their various clans. 

Adebowale was educated at Thornes House School, Wakefield and the Polytechnic of East London. He began his career in Local Authority Estate Management before joining the housing association movement. He spent time with Patchwork Community Housing Association and was Regional Director of the Ujima Housing Association, Britain's largest black-led housing association. He was Director of the Alcohol Recovery Project and then Chief Executive of youth homelessness charity Centrepoint. Adebowale was a member of the Social Exclusion Unit's Policy Action Team on Young People and was Chair of the Review of Social Housing Co-ordination by the Institute of Public Policy Research.

Adebowale joined Turning Point as Chief Executive in September 2001. Turning Point is a care organisation providing services for people with complex needs, including those affected by drug and alcohol misuse, mental health problems and those with a learning disability. In addition to providing direct services, Turning Point also campaigns nationally on behalf of those with social care needs.  He left Turning Point in 2019 and became chair of the NHS Confederation.

Adebowale has been involved in a number of taskforce groups, advising the government on mental health, learning disability and the role of the voluntary sector. He is Co-Chair of the Black and Minority Ethnic Mental Health National Steering Group and is a member of the Advisory Council on the Misuse of Drugs. He is a patron of Rich Mix Centre Celebrating Cultural Diversity, a patron of Tomorrow's Project and of the National College for School Leadership. He was a member of the National Employment Panel, the New Economics Foundation Board and is a member of the Institute for Fiscal Studies Council. He is a Director of Leadership in Mind organisational development consultancy, a non-exec of the health IT consultancy IOCOM, Chair of Collaborate and in 2015/16 chaired  The London Fairness Commission.  He has advised governments of all parties on Employment, Housing, Poverty and Public Service Reform. In 2017 he was appointed to be the chair of Social Enterprise UK, an umbrella body for social enterprises in the UK. In February 2020 he introduced a Commission on Social Investment to record experiences of how the social investment market worked with social enterprises and then produce recommendations for any changes or improvements. The commission's work continued into 2021.

Academic history and awards
Adebowale has an honorary PhD from the University of Central England in Birmingham, an honorary doctorate of letters from the University of Lincoln, an honorary PhD from the University of East London, an honorary doctorate from the University of Bradford, where he is involved with their Centre for Inclusion and Diversity, and most recently an honorary doctorate from the University of York.  He is an honorary fellow of London South Bank University and Honorary Senior Fellow in the Health Services Management Centre at the University of Birmingham. In 2009 he was awarded an honorary Doctor of Laws (LLD) degree from Lancaster University.

On 12 December 2008, Adebowale was installed as Chancellor of the University of Lincoln.
Adebowale has a Post Graduate Diploma From the Tavistock institute and an MA in Advanced Organisational Consulting from the City University London.

Criticism
In 2015, Turning Point was involved in an employment tribunal claiming that Adebowale had unfairly dismissed the charity's IT director, Ibukun Adebayo. The tribunal did find that Adebayo's actions in accessing lewd emails about her from the charity's deputy chief executive to Adebowale, constituted gross misconduct, but ruled that this did not justify Adebowale's actions. Adebayo's lawyers said that the actions were unfair because the deputy chief executive's behaviour "was more serious than the claimant's by way of his seniority and position as sponsor of Turning Point's equal opportunities policy."

References

External links
 Turning Point
 
 

1962 births
British charity and campaign group workers
English people of Nigerian descent
Nigerian recipients of British titles
Commanders of the Order of the British Empire
Living people
People's peers
People associated with the University of Bradford
Black British politicians
English people of Yoruba descent
Alumni of the University of East London
Yoruba politicians
People associated with the University of Lincoln
Alumni of City, University of London
Life peers created by Elizabeth II